Third-seeds Kevin Curren and Steve Denton won the title and shared $12,000 after beating Raúl Ramírez and Van Winitsky in the final.

Seeds
A champion seed is indicated in bold text while text in italics indicates the round in which that seed was eliminated.

Draw

Finals

Top half

Bottom half

References

External links

U.S. Clay Court Championships
1981 U.S. Clay Court Championships